Anne or Ann Ford, (Mrs Philip Thicknesse, 22 February 1737 – 20 January 1824) was an 18th-century English musician and singer, famous in her time for a scandal that attended her struggle to perform in public.

Life and music
Some aspects of Anne Ford's life are typical of talented and gifted women in the traditional class society of 18th-century England. She gained more education than most as she had a knowledge of five foreign languages and played several fretted string instruments, including the lute-like English guitar and the viola da gamba, comparable to a modern cello. This gave her a chance to perform with others giving Sunday concerts at her house, although her father, Thomas Ford, refused to allow her to perform publicly. She also was a singer with a beautiful voice by her early twenties, but her earliest attempts to appear in public venues were unsuccessful; her father went so far as to have her arrested twice to prevent her escaping his control. Eventually she made a successful escape, and held her first public subscription concert on 18 March 1760. She performed a series of subsequent concerts, including daily performances from 24 October to 30 October of that year, although it was considered controversial for a woman to play the "masculine" viola da gamba, referred to at the time as the viol di gambo.

Ford gave a performance at Spring Gardens in 1761, "English airs". accompanying herself on the musical glasses. She also wrote a published work, Instructions for Playing on the Musical Glasses. The instrument was comparable to the glass harp of Richard Pockrich consisting of individual glass goblets tuned with water, and preceded the 1761 mechanized armonica (Glass harmonica) invention of Benjamin Franklin and played by Marianne Davies.

Ford's accomplishments risked being complicated by an infatuated lover, the Earl of Jersey, who offered her £800 a year to be his mistress. When she refused, Lord Jersey tried to sabotage her initial public concert, but she earned £15 from it nonetheless. In 1761 she published a pamphlet, A Letter from Miss F—d to a Person of Distinction, defending her position. This in turn provoked a pamphlet from the Earl, A Letter to Miss F–d. The brief pamphlet war between them differed in subject and tone from others conducted in that era.

Later life
On 27 September 1762, she became the third wife of Philip Thicknesse, thereby gaining higher social standing. They had a son who became Captain John Thicknesse  RN (c. 1763–1846).

She and her husband were travelling to Italy in 1792, during the Reign of Terror in the French Revolution, when Thicknesse died suddenly in Boulogne. Anne was arrested as a foreigner and imprisoned. After the execution of Maximilien Robespierre in July 1794, she was released under a general pardon for all prisoners who could prove that they could earn their living; her profession stood her in good stead.

In 1800 Anne Ford published an autobiographical roman à clef entitled The School for Fashion, which included many public figures of the day in thin disguise. She herself featured as Euterpe.

Her portrait was painted by Thomas Gainsborough in 1760.

References

English women singers
1737 births
1824 deaths